The New Maverick is a 1978 American Western television film based on the 1957–1962 series Maverick starring James Garner as Bret Maverick. The New Maverick also stars Garner as Bret Maverick with Charles Frank as newcomer cousin Ben Maverick (son of Beau Maverick), Jack Kelly as Bart Maverick, and Susan Sullivan as Poker Alice Ivers.

James Garner and Jack Kelly had been 29 and 30 years old, respectively, at the beginning of the original series and were 50 and 51 while filming The New Maverick. The TV-movie was a pilot for the series Young Maverick, which featured Frank and only lasted a few episodes. Directed by Hy Averback and written by Juanita Bartlett, the movie was filmed while Garner's series The Rockford Files was on hiatus. Garner would later star in Bret Maverick, another attempt at a series revival inspired by this TV-movie, for the 1981-82 season.

Garner wrote in his memoir that the film "didn't quite make it," calling it "a near miss."

Cast 
 James Garner as Bret Maverick
 Charles Frank as Ben Maverick
 Jack Kelly as Bart Maverick
 Susan Sullivan as Poker Alice
 Susan Blanchard as Nell McGarahan
 Eugene Roche as Austin Crupper
 George Loros as Vinnie Smith, Train Robber hired by Crupper
 Woodrow Parfrey as Leveque, Man from New Orleans
 Greg Allen as Dobie
 Helen Page Camp as Mrs. Flora Crupper
 Jack Garner as Homer, Vinnie's henchman
 Graham Jarvis as Undertaker Lambert
 Macon McCalman as Vanders the Las Vegas Hotel Desk Clerk
 B.J. Ward as B.J. Vinnie's Henchman

References

External links
 

1978 television films
ABC network original films
1978 Western (genre) films
American Western (genre) television films
Films based on television series
Television series reunion films
Television films based on television series
Films directed by Hy Averback
Maverick (TV series)
1970s English-language films